The Harry Henson Stakes was an American Thoroughbred horse race run annually during the third week of April as part of the opening day races of the spring/summer meet at Hollywood Park Racetrack in Inglewood, California. Open to three-year-old horses, it was a non-graded stakes raced on turf that has been contested at a distance of six furlongs  since 2007. The race offered a purse of US$70,000.

Inaugurated in 1952 as the Debonair Stakes, it was renamed in 1991 to honor Harry Henson, a former jockey who was Hollywood Park's race caller from 1958 to 1982.

Past winners include Imbros in 1953, Kentucky Derby winner Determine in 1954, and a son of Imbros in 1962, the U.S. Racing Hall of Fame inductee, Native Diver.

Records
Speed  record: (at current distance of 6 furlongs.
 1:08.16 - Backbackbackgone (2009)

Recent winners

References
 Hollywood Park opening day at the Blood-Horse.com
 The 2009 Harry Henson Stakes at Hollywood Park.com

External links
 The Harry Henson Stakes at Pedigree Query

Ungraded stakes races in the United States
Flat horse races for three-year-olds
Turf races in the United States
Horse races established in 1952
Hollywood Park Racetrack
Horse races in California
1952 establishments in California